Mount Pocaterra is the unofficial name of a rocky formation named after the Pocaterra Creek in the same region. It is located in the Elk Range in Alberta.
This peak is located on the crest of a ridge, about 1.5 km north of the lower Mount Tyrwhitt. The peak is a double summit, with the north summit slightly higher.

See also
 Geography of Alberta

References

Gallery

External links
 Mt. Pocaterra photo: Flickr

Two-thousanders of Alberta
Alberta's Rockies